The 2007 Men's European Water Polo Olympic Qualification Tournament for the Games of the XXIX Olympiad in Beijing 2008 was held in Bratislava, Slovakia from September 2 to September 9, 2007.  Croatia, Hungary, Spain and Serbia had already qualified for the Olympics, so they did not participate.  Montenegro defeated Romania in the final and so earned a berth for the 2008 Summer Olympics Water Polo Competition.

Preliminary round

Group A

September 2, 2007

September 3, 2007

September 4, 2007

September 5, 2007

September 6, 2007

Group B

September 2, 2007

September 3, 2007

September 4, 2007

September 5, 2007

September 6, 2007

Finals

Placement

5th-8th

9th-11th

Final ranking

Montenegro qualified for the 2008 Summer Olympics in Beijing, PR China; Teams placed from 6th up to 2nd will play in the 2008 FINA Olympic Qualification Tournament in Oradea, Romania

See also
2007 Women's European Water Polo Olympic Qualifier

References
 LEN Website

Olympic
W
W